The Great Game was the political and diplomatic confrontation that existed during the 19th century between Britain and Russia.

The Great Game may also refer to:

Literature
 The Great Game (Peter Hopkirk book), a 1992 history book about Central Asia
 The Great Game (Gordon book), a 1999 finance book by John Steele Gordon
 A Great Game, a 2013 sports history book, by Stephen Harper, about Canadian ice hockey
 The Great Game, an autobiography of Leopold Trepper, a communist spy during World War II

Film
 The Great Game (1930 film), a British film directed by Jack Raymond
 The Great Game (1953 film), a British film directed by Maurice Elvey
 The Great Game (1997 film), the original title of Frozen, a Chinese film directed by Wang Xiaoshuai
 The Great Game (2015 film), a French film directed by Nicolas Pariser
 "The Great Game" (Sherlock), an episode of Sherlock

Other uses
 The Great Game: Afghanistan, a 2009 series of British plays on the history of Afghanistan
 Great Getaway Game, a 1990–1991 game show
 Sherlockian game or the Great Game, the pastime of attempting to resolve anomalies and clarify implied details about Sherlock Holmes
 The Great Gamble, a 2009 book about the Soviet-Afghan war

See also
 Big Game (disambiguation)
 Scarlet Traces: The Great Game, a 2006 steampunk comic book
 Spycraft: The Great Game, a 1996 computer game